Candidodon is an extinct genus of notosuchian mesoeucrocodylian. Fossils have been found in the Early Cretaceous Itapecuru Formation in Brazil.

Description 
The genus is characterized by a particularly elongate pair of choanae in its palate. It has been named the type genus of the family Candidodontidae, first constructed in 2004. It was initially assigned to the family with a proposed sister genus, Mariliasuchus, but a recent phylogenetic analysis has shown that Mariliasuchus may instead be closer in relation to Comahuesuchus than to Candidodon and thus a member of the family Comahuesuchidae. If this is true, Candidodon would be the only member of the family Candidodontidae.

References 

Notosuchians
Early Cretaceous crocodylomorphs of South America
Albian life
Fossil taxa described in 1988
Prehistoric pseudosuchian genera